Camera Store is a 2017 American drama film directed and written by Scott Marshall Smith.  The film stars John Larroquette, John Rhys-Davies, Paul Ben-Victor, David James Elliott, Laura Silverman and Cheryl Ladd.  The film was released on June 19, 2017 by Provocator.

Plot
Ray LaPine (John Larroquette) and Pinky Steuben  (John Rhys-Davies) work at a tired old camera store named Bibideaux Photographic. The entire movie occurs on Christmas Eve 1994.

Production
Production took place in Louisiana in early 2016, with a budget of $4.4 million.

See also
 List of Christmas films

References

External links
 

2017 films
2017 directorial debut films
2017 drama films
2017 independent films
2010s Christmas drama films
American Christmas drama films
American drama films
American independent films
Films set in 1994
Films set in New York (state)
Films set in shopping malls
Films shot in Louisiana
2010s English-language films
2010s American films